Enanallur is a village in Kumbakonam taluk, Thanjavur district, Tamil Nadu.

Demographics 

As per the 2001 census, Enanallur had a population of 2079 with 1068 males and 1011 females. The sex ratio was 947 and the literacy rate, 69.19.

References 

 

Villages in Thanjavur district